Carolyn "Carrie" Hessler Radelet is the 19th and former director of the Peace Corps. She was the deputy director and chief operating officer of the Peace Corps from April 2010 to December 2015, serving as acting Peace Corps director from September 2012 until June 2014 when she was elevated to director. She resigned on January 20, 2017.

Early life and education 
Hessler Radelet served as a Peace Corps volunteer in Apia, Western Samoa, from 1981 to 1984, where she taught high school and designed, organized, and conducted a national public awareness campaign on disaster preparedness. Hessler Radelet received a B.A. in political science and economics from Boston University in 1979 and a Master of Science in health policy and management, with a concentration in international health and marketing, from Harvard School of Public Health in 1990.

Career
Hessler Radelet began her career as a Peace Corps Volunteer secondary school teacher in Apia, Western Samoa, from 1981 to 1984. Upon her return the U.S., she was the public affairs manager at the Peace Corps Regional Office in Boston from 1984 to 1986.

From 1986 to 1988, she founded and served as the executive director of the Special Olympics in the Republic of The Gambia, planning, developing and managing that country's first national Special Olympics games. She also served as a consultant with The Gambia Family Planning Association.

From 1989 to 1991, Hessler Radelet served as the acting director of the Boston International Group with John Snow, Inc. She served as a technical advisor for the MotherCare Project for John Snow, Inc. in Indonesia from 1991 to 1994  and as an HIV/AIDS advisor with the Health and Child Survival Fellows Program at the USAID in Indonesia from 1994 to 1995. She was the director of the JSI/Boston International Group, for John Snow, Inc. in Boston from 1996 to 2000. From 2000-2010 she was the vice president and director of John Snow, Inc. (for-profit) and JSI Research and Training Institute, Inc. (non-profit) in the Washington, D.C., area.

Deputy director of the Peace Corps

On November 9, 2009, President Barack Obama nominated Hessler Radelet to serve as the deputy director of the Peace Corps. She was appointed on June 23, 2010.

At the time of her nomination she was the director at the JSI Research and Training Institute, Inc, a global public health organization, where she oversaw the management of programs in more than 30 countries. Hessler Radelet was a board member of the National Peace Corps Association and served on the steering committee for the US Coalition for Child Survival. During her time as deputy director, she led the roll-out of the Focus In/Train Up initiative, which provides targeted technical training to volunteers to increase their capacity-building abilities.

Director of the Peace Corps

On July 18, 2013, President Barack Obama announced his intent to nominate Hessler Radelet as the director of the Peace Corps. She was confirmed as director on June 5, 2014. As Peace Corps director, Hessler Radelet has led an extensive organizational reform effort, most notably to enhance the health and safety of trainees and volunteers (including the development of a sexual assault risk reduction and response program); improve the quality of Peace Corps’ technical training and program support for volunteers; increase the impact and operational efficiency of agency operations; strengthen intercultural competence, diversity and inclusion; enhance the visibility and image of Peace Corps; attracted record numbers of applicants; and expand and strengthen public-private partnerships to increase funding, enhance brand image and strengthen technical programming.

Service in presidential delegations

Hessler Radelet has served as the leader or part of a presidential delegation in two instances. On January 13, 2012, President Barack Obama announced the delegation to attend the Inauguration of Ellen Johnson Sirleaf of Liberia. On January 16, 2012, Hessler Radelet, then deputy director, went to Monrovia as part of a presidential delegation along with the then United States Ambassador to Liberia, Linda Thomas-Greenfield and United States Senator of Delaware, Christopher Coons, amongst others, led by then Secretary of State Hillary Clinton. On February 20, 2013, President Barack Obama announced the delegation to attend the Inauguration of Ernest Bai Koroma of Sierra Leone. Hessler Radelet led the delegation.

President and CEO of Project Concern International and Global Communities 
In February 2017, Hessler Radelet was named president and CEO of Project Concern International, a San Diego-based international development organization, by the board of directors. In 2019, Project Concern International merged with Global Communities, and in October 2022 Hessler Radelet was named the president and CEO of Global Communities.

Honors and awards

Hessler Radelet has received honorary degrees from Austin College (2013), University of Puget Sound (2015), Boston University (2016), Michigan Technological University (2016), Virginia Wesleyan University (2016), and Williams College (2016). She received the Society for International Development, Award for Outstanding Leadership in International Development in November 2016.

Personal life
Hessler Radelet's aunt, Virginia Kirkwood, was the 10,000th Peace Corps volunteer, serving in Turkey from 1964 to 1966 and later as the Peace Corps country director in Thailand. Hessler Radelet's grandparents served in Malaysia (1972–1973), and her nephew recently completed his service as an HIV education volunteer in Mozambique (2007–2009).

She and her husband, international development economist Steven Radelet, served together as a couple in the Peace Corps and have two grown children.

References

Living people
Peace Corps directors
Peace Corps volunteers
Boston University College of Arts and Sciences alumni
Harvard School of Public Health alumni
American expatriates in Samoa
Year of birth missing (living people)